Terina Lily Te Tamaki (born 1 May 1997) is a New Zealand rugby union player.

Family and private life
Te Tamaki was born in 1997. Sevens player Isaac Te Tamaki is her elder brother. Teresa Te Tamaki is her cousin. Of Māori descent, Te Tamaki affiliates to the Te Arawa, Waikato and Ngāti Maniapoto iwi. She received her education at Hamilton Girls' High School.

Rugby career
Te Tamaki used to watch her elder brother play rugby for Hamilton Boys' High School and thought the sport was not for her, as it was too scary and had too much contact. But the Girls' High coach, former Black Fern Crystal Kaua, convinced her to start the sport. It became her dream to make it to the 2020 Summer Olympics in Tokyo.

Te Tamaki was contracted to the New Zealand women's sevens team in January 2016 and made her debut at the USA Women's Sevens. She was selected for New Zealand's women's sevens team to the 2016 Summer Olympics. She won a silver medal with the team and broke a New Zealand record held since the 1952 Summer Olympics by becoming the country's youngest female medallist. However, she only held the honour for 18 months until the record broken again by 16-year-old Zoi Sadowski-Synnott at the 2018 Winter Olympics.

Te Tamaki was named as a travelling reserve for the Black Ferns Sevens squad to the 2022 Commonwealth Games in Birmingham.

References

External links
 

1997 births
Rugby sevens players at the 2016 Summer Olympics
Olympic rugby sevens players of New Zealand
New Zealand female rugby union players
New Zealand international rugby union players
New Zealand female rugby sevens players
New Zealand women's international rugby sevens players
New Zealand Māori rugby union players
Living people
Rugby union hookers
Te Arawa people
Ngāti Maniapoto people
Waikato Tainui people
Olympic silver medalists for New Zealand
Olympic medalists in rugby sevens
Medalists at the 2016 Summer Olympics
People educated at Hamilton Girls' High School